"My Thang" is a funk song written and recorded by James Brown. Unlike most of his songs, this song was released not as a two-part single, but instead issued with three different B-sides. It spent two weeks at number one on the R&B singles chart - Brown's second #1 in a row, following "The Payback" - and reached No. 29 on the Billboard Hot 100 in July 1974. The song also appeared on Brown's 1974 double album Hell.

Personnel
 James Brown - lead vocals
 probably Lew Soloff - trumpet
 John Faddis - trumpet
 Michael Gipson - trombone
 David Sanborn - alto sax
 Frank Vicari - tenor sax
 Joe Farrell - tenor sax
 Alfred "Pee Wee" Ellis - baritone sax
 Dave Matthews - piano
 Joe Beck - guitar
 Sam Brown - guitar
 Gordon Edwards - bass
 Jimmy Madison - drums
 Sue Evans - percussion
 Fred Wesley - tambourine, background vocals
 Bobby Roach - background vocals
 Johnny Scotton - background vocals

Samples
"My Thang" is also sampled on various songs, including: 
"Brand New Funk" by DJ Jazzy Jeff & The Fresh Prince 
"Funky Child" by Lords Of The Underground
"Gotta Have It (song)" by Kanye West & Jay-Z
Guy - "Groove Me"
Heavy D & The Boyz - "We Got Our Own Thang"
Bell Biv DeVoe - "Something in Your Eyes"

In popular culture
The song was featured in the 1990 psychological horror film Jacob's Ladder.

See also
List of number-one R&B singles of 1974 (U.S.)

References

External links
 AllMusic review

1974 singles
James Brown songs
Songs written by James Brown
1974 songs
Polydor Records singles